, also known by his Korean name of Moon Jang-gyu (Hangul: 문장규; Hanja: 文章圭), is a South Korean martial artist in Japan. He is the master of Kyokushin karate and current Kancho (Director) of the International Karate Organization Kyokushin-kaikan, faction of the International Karate Organization (IKO) founded by Mas Oyama (1923–1994).

Early life
Matsui was born in 1963 and started training in Kyokushin karate at age 13. In 1976, he joined the Kita Nagare-Yama Dojo in Chiba Prefecture and attained the rank of 1st dan black belt in a little over one year.

Later years
Matsui completed the 100-man kumite in 1987, when ranked 4th dan. In May 1992, Matsui opened his own dojo in Asakusa, Tokyo, and was later appointed as a Branch Chief by Oyama.

Near the end of his life, some say that Oyama named Matsui (then ranked 5th dan, and clearly junior in rank to several senior instructors) to succeed him in leading the IKO. However this has been disputed with his family and Matsui. Reportedly, a letter by senior Kyokushin instructor Peter Chong noted that Matsui was surprised to hear that he had been appointed to succeed Oyama, but also that Oyama had earlier named Matsui before several other people as the leading candidate to succeed him. Matsui then became Kancho (Director). Following a dispute over the veracity of Oyama's will, Kyokushin karate as an organization divided into three main groups, led by Matsui, Kenji Midori, and Yoshikazu Matsushima.

Matsui is currently ranked 8th dan, and leads one of the IKO groups, supported by Yuzo Goda, Bobby Lowe, Peter Chong, and Seiji Isobe. Loek Hollander had previously supported Matsui, but withdrew his support in August 2010. Subsequently, Peter Chong parted ways with Matsui in 2018 and formed his own organization.

Tournament achievements
Matsui's tournament achievements include:
 1980 — placed 4th in the 12th All Japan Open Karate Championships, when he was just 17 
 1981 — took 3rd place in the All Japan Open Karate Championships
 1982 — took 3rd place in the same event
 1983 — placed 8th place in the same event
 1984 — placed 3rd in the 3rd World Open Karate Tournament 
 1985 — placed 1st in the same event
 1986 — placed 1st in the same event and completed 100 man kumite
 1987 — won the 4th World Open Karate Tournament, becoming the youngest champion ever

References

External links
 International Karate Organization Kyokushin-kaikan 
 国際空手道連盟極真会館 

 

Living people
1963 births
Japanese male karateka
Karate coaches
Kyokushin kaikan practitioners
South Korean expatriate sportspeople in Japan
Japanese sports executives and administrators
Chuo University alumni
Sportspeople from Tokyo
Zainichi Korean people